St Edmund's College, Canberra is an independent Catholic primary and secondary school for boys, located in Griffith, a suburb of Canberra, in the Australian Capital Territory (ACT), Australia.

The college was established in 1954 by the Christian Brothers as St Edmund's War Memorial College.  It was opened to meet the demand for a Catholic education school in the region and was the first Catholic secondary boys' college established in the ACT. St Edmund's College practises in the tradition of Edmund Ignatius Rice. The current principal of the college is Joe Zavone.

Students are placed into houses for sporting and other events. The current houses and colours are: Clancy (yellow), Treacy (dark blue), O'Brien (white), Haydon (red), Mulrooney (sky blue) and Rice (green).

History
St Edmund's War Memorial College opened in 1954 as a Christian Brothers school in response to the needs of Catholic parents of the region. St. Edmund's was the first Catholic secondary boys' college established in Canberra.

Headmasters / principals 
The following individuals have served as headmasters or principals of the College:

Rugby union
The college has won the Waratah Shield more than any other school (14 times) and was the defending champion in 2005, when schools from the ACT were no longer invited/permitted to participate by the organisers, the New South Wales Rugby Union. The college has over 480 registered boys playing rugby union. St Edmund's College has a reputation for being one of the premier rugby schools in Australia, with Saia Fainga'a being the latest alumnus to represent Australia. The college also have always had a brilliant record in the local competition (ACTJRU) with many grand finals to their name across the different age groups.

Ancillary bodies 
In reflecting the spirit of charity of Edmund Rice, St Edmund's College established the St Edmund's College Foundation with the aim of giving financial assistance to disadvantaged families to support children's education.

The St Edmund's College Old Boys and Friends Association was established in 2015.

Arts
 Matthew Le Nevez – television actor
 Tommy Murphy – award-winning playwright
 Flip Simmons – theatre actor and singer

Business
John A. Bryant – President & CEO of the Kellogg's and Director of Macy's, Inc

Military and police

  Lieutenant General David Morrison  – former Chief of Army and 2016 Australian of the Year

Politics, public service, and law
 John Barilaro  – Member for Monaro and Deputy Premier of New South Wales
 Terence Higgins   – former Chief Justice of the Supreme Court of the Australian Capital Territory (2003–2013)
 Warren Snowdon  – Member for Lingiari (since 2001); formerly the Member for Northern Territory (1987–1996; 1998–2001)

Religion
 Most Rev. Patrick Power – Auxiliary Bishop Emeritus of Canberra and Goulburn

Sport
 Finlay Bealham – Irish rugby union player for Ireland national rugby union team and Connacht Rugby
 Robbie Coleman – Australian rugby union footballer for the Brumbies
 Anthony Fainga'a – Australian rugby union footballer for the Wallabies and the Brumbies
 Colby Fainga'a – Australian rugby union footballer for the Melbourne Rebels
 Saia Fainga'a – Australian rugby union footballer for the Wallabies and the Brumbies
 Vili Fainga'a – rugby union footballer for the Tonga national rugby union team and former rugby league footballer for the Canberra Raiders and Melbourne Storm
 David Furner – former professional rugby league footballer and coach for the Canberra Raiders and NSW State of Origin team
 Matt Giteau – former Australian rugby union footballer for the Wallabies and the Brumbies
 George Gregan – former Australian rugby union footballer for the Wallabies and Brumbies; the most-capped rugby union international of all time
 Matt Henjak – former Australian rugby union footballer for the Wallabies and the Western Force
 Alex Jesaulenko – Australian rules football player
 Nate Osborne – head coach of Major League Rugby's New Orleans Gold
 Matt Pini – former Australian rugby union footballer for the Wallabies and Italy
 Luke Priddis – Australian rugby league footballer for the Kangaroos, Penrith Panthers and St George Illawarra Dragons
 Stephen Simmonds – Paralympic swimming medallist and disabled water ski world champion
 Tyrone Smith – former Australian rugby union footballer for the Brumbies and Tonga
 Ricky Stuart – former Australian dual-code rugby player, coach of the Cronulla Sharks, NSW State of Origin team, Parramatta Eels and Canberra Raiders

See also

 List of schools in the Australian Capital Territory
 Associated Southern Colleges
 Edmund Ignatius Rice
 Catholic education in Australia

References

External links
 St Edmund's College website
 St Edmund's College Rugby website

Congregation of Christian Brothers secondary schools in Australia
Boys' schools in the Australian Capital Territory
Catholic primary schools in the Australian Capital Territory
Catholic secondary schools in the Australian Capital Territory
Educational institutions established in 1954
1954 establishments in Australia
Congregation of Christian Brothers primary schools in Australia